CTD nuclear envelope phosphatase 1 is a protein in humans that is encoded by the CTDNEP1 gene.

References

Further reading 

Human proteins